Jabal al-Fawwar is a mountain in Hama Governorate in Syria. It has an elevation of 1,174 meters, it ranks as the third highest mountain in Hama and the 203rd highest in Syria.

See also

List of mountains of Syria

References 

Mountains of Hama Governorate